Elmir Halil Asani (born 15 September 1995) is a Serbian footballer of Gorani descent who plays as a left-wing for Tekstilac Odžaci.

Early life
Asani was born in Novi Sad, FR Yugoslavia is the son of player of Borac Novi Sad, Halil Asani.

Club career

Vojvodina
In 2011. Asani signed scholarship contract with Vojvodina. He, along other players from Vojvodina youth team took part in the competition "The Chance", which is used for searching talents. On 17 April 2014, Asani made his Serbian SuperLiga debut for the first team in a 1–2 away win against Sloboda Užice after coming on as a substitute.

Tekstilac Odžaci
On 27 June 2021, he joined Serbian League Vojvodina club Tekstilac Odžaci.

References

External links

1995 births
Footballers from Novi Sad
Gorani people
Living people
Serbian footballers
Association football midfielders
FK Vojvodina players
FK Voždovac players
FK Zemun players
FC Mauerwerk players
KF Skënderbeu Korçë players
OFK Bačka players
Serbian SuperLiga players
2. Liga (Austria) players
Kategoria Superiore players
Serbian First League players
Serbian expatriate footballers
Expatriate footballers in Austria
Serbian expatriate sportspeople in Austria
Expatriate footballers in Albania
Serbian expatriate sportspeople in Albania